Cheyenne Renee Haynes is an American actress, dancer, singer, and model.  Her notable works include the Lifetime Movie Network television film Lies in Plain Sight, I Know My Kid's a Star, HBO's Camping, and CW's The Lost Boys.

Early life
Cheyenne was born in Los Angeles, California, in the neighborhood of Silverlake and raised by her mother, Helene Kress. Cheyenne followed the family line as her mother and father were both musicians and performers. Helene was a singer and actress. Her father, Scott Haynes, was a self-taught multi-instrumentalist and singer. Kress and Haynes were never married.

Career

Acting
Haynes booked her first job as a model at the age of two for the movie Baby Geniuses.  She also booked her first commercial at the same age.
Haynes worked on various commercials, print ads, TV Shows & Films until her first major breakthrough in the industry when she landed a spot on the reality TV show, Danny Bonaduce's I Know My Kid's a Star.  Haynes booked her spot with a single audition and was beloved by viewers during the course of the show, eventually placing as the runner-up. She gained critical acclaim for her next major role as Eva in the Lifetime Movie Network's Lies in Plain Sight, with her mother being portrayed by Rosie Pérez

Filmography

Video
Fragile Tension / Hole to Feed  ... Lead Singer
Bill Nye – Electricity   ... Lead Singer/Dancer/Voice Over
8 Days Of Christmas  ... Beyoncé's Friend
The La La Song   ... Pom Pom Girl
Good Love  ... Flower Girl
All I Want Is Happiness  ... Girl in Park
Blow  ... Female Bruno Mars

Theatre
Standing on the Shoulders Of Giants  ... Maxine
The American Girls Revue  ... Keisha/Addy
Pepito's Story  ... Beach Girl (Dancer)
Chaka Khan Benefit  ... Singer/Dancer
World Literacy Crusade  ... Dancer
Spirit of Play  ... Singer/Dancer
Make Mine 369  ... Star

References

External links
 
 VH1 – The Celebreality Interview – Helene Kress, VH1 – I Know My Kid's a Star.
 Lies in Plain Sight
 I Know My Kid's a Star

American television actresses
American female dancers
Dancers from California
Female models from California
American women singers
Living people
Actresses from Los Angeles
Year of birth missing (living people)
20th-century American actresses
21st-century American actresses